In mathematics, a G-algebra can mean either
An algebra over a field equipped with an algebraic representation .
A G-ring that is also an associative algebra.